The Matra-Cantinieau MC-101 was an early 1950s French experimental two seat helicopter of conventional tail rotor configuration but with its engine mounted close to the main rotor, above the seating.

Design and development
The helicopters designed by Jean Cantinieau were distinguished by having an engine positioned in front and immediately below the main rotor drive shaft, above the cockpit. The first of the series was the Cantinieau C-100, which had an open tube frame structure with a braced single tube tail boom, four wheel undercarriage and a  Minié engine. It first flew in September 1951.

Cantinieau went to the Société Matra to build a two-seat development, the MC-101. It had a  Hirth HM-504 engine, enclosed in a long, smooth nosed but partially open sided cowling, driving the oscillating rotor hub via a 41:6 reduction gearbox, clutch and Paulstra universal joint. The rotor blades were machined from duralumin. A three blade tail rotor was driven via another Paulstra joint and cardan shaft.

The MC-101 carried two pilots side by side with dual control.  There was no cabin but they were protected behind a large perspex screen with rounded vertical edges.  It flew for the first time on 11 November 1952.  Only one was built.

In 1953 Cantinieau was appointed as director of the Spanish company Aerotécnica's new helicopter division, which also acquired the rights to the MC-101 from Matra.  The Hirth engine was replaced with a more powerful  air-cooled flat four Lycoming O-320, in order to cope better with Madrid's hot and high atmosphere, and the helicopter was renamed the Aerotécnica AC-11.  Further development led to the Aerotécnica AC-12 with an enclosed fuselage and cabin.

Variants
Matra-Cantinieau MC-101  Hirth HM-504 engine.
Aerotécnica AC-11 MC-101 with  Lycoming O-320 engine.

Specifications (MC-101)

References

1950s French helicopters
Single-engined piston helicopters